Kaedyn Kamara (born 29 November 2005) is an English professional footballer who plays as a midfielder for Preston North End.

Career
Kamara is a youth product of Burnley, before moving to the youth academy of Preston North End in June 2022. He made his professional debut with Preston North End as a late substitute in a 3–1 FA Cup win over Huddersfield Town on 7 January 2023.

Personal life
Kamara was a national boxing champion and world champion in kickboxing away from football as a youth.

References

External links
 
 PNE FC Profile

2005 births
Living people
Footballers from Liverpool
English footballers
Preston North End F.C. players
English Football League players
Association football midfielders